Ilocos Norte, officially the Province of Ilocos Norte, is a province of the Philippines located in the Ilocos Region. Its capital is Laoag City, located in the northwest corner of Luzon Island, bordering Cagayan and Apayao to the east, and Abra to the southeast, and Ilocos Sur to the southwest. Ilocos Norte faces the West Philippine Sea to the west and the Luzon Strait to the north.

Ilocos Norte is noted for its distinctive geography and culture. This includes numerous examples of well-preserved Spanish colonial era architecture, particularly Saint William's Cathedral in Laoag with its sinking bell tower done in the Earthquake Baroque style, the St. Augustine Church in Paoay which is one of UNESCO's World Heritage Sites in the Philippines and the Cape Bojeador Lighthouse.  Famous geographical features include the La Paz Sand Dunes, the beaches of Pagudpud, and the eroded calcarenite Kapurpurawan rock formation in Burgos.  It is the birthplace of several notable Philippine leaders including former President Ferdinand E. Marcos, Philippine Revolutionary War general Artemio Ricarte and Iglesia Filipina Independiente co-founder Gregorio Aglipay. Three  wind farms are located in Ilocos Norte.  They are located in Burgos, Pagudpud and Bangui with the latter being the first wind power generation plant in the Philippines.

History

Early history 
Long before the arrival of the Spaniards there existed an extensive region consisting of Ilocos Norte, Ilocos Sur, Abra and La Union. Merchants from Japan and China would often visit the area to trade gold for beads, ceramics and silk. The Austronesian inhabitants of the region called their place samtoy, from sao mi toy, which literally meant "our language".

Spanish colonial era 
In 1571, the Spanish conquistadors had Manila under their control and they began looking for new sites to conquer.  Miguel Lopez de Legazpi's grandson Juan de Salcedo volunteered to lead one of these expeditions. Together with 8 armed boats and 45 men the 22-year-old voyager headed north.  On June 13, 1572, Salcedo and his men landed in present-day Vigan then proceeded to Laoag, Currimao and Badoc. As they sailed along the coast they were surprised to see numerous sheltered coves (looc) where the locals lived in harmony. They named the region Ylocos and its people Ylocanos.

As the Christianization of the region grew so did the landscape of the area. Vast tracts of land were utilized for churches and bell towers in line with the Spanish mission of bajo las campanas. In the town plaza it was not uncommon to see garrisons under the church bells.  Indigenous peoples living in the Ilocos Region, such as the Yapayao and Isneg, were slowly pushed into living in the sparsely populated but resource-rich mountains, which would expose them to conflicts with developers in later eras, such as during Martial Law under Ferdinand Marcos.

Spanish colonization of the region was not completely successful. Owing to the abusive practices of many Augustinian friars a number of Ilocanos revolted. Noteworthy of these were the Dingras uprising (1589) and the Pedro Almasan revolt (San Nicolas, 1660). In 1762 Diego Silang led a series of battles aimed at freeing the Ilocano. When he died from his friendly fire his widow Gabriela continued his cause. She too was captured and executed.

In 1807 the sugar cane (basi) brewers of Piddig rose up in arms to protest the government's monopoly of the wine industry. In 1898 the church excommunicated Gregorio Aglipay for refusing to cut off ties with the revolutionary forces of Gen. Emilio Aguinaldo. Unperturbed, he helped established the Iglesia Filipina Independiente.

In an effort to gain political control and because of the increasing population of the region, a Royal Decree was signed on February 2, 1818, splitting Ilocos into two provinces: Ilocos Norte and Ilocos Sur. Soon thereafter, La Union and Abra became independent provinces.

World War II 
After the fall of Corregidor and the subsequent occupation of the Philippines by the Empire of Japan, a number of small guerilla groups formed in the area of Ilocos Norte, some of which resorted to banditry. Governor Roque Ablan Sr., with the help of Philippine Army Lt. Feliciano Madamba, was able to put together a guerilla unit to engage the Japanese forces and to rally the other guerilla groups into a common force.  The leaders were assigned specific sectors using a system for distributing news and orders.

Martial law era 
Ilocos Norte gained additional prominence in December 1965 when Ferdinand Marcos became president, and again when he won a second term in 1969, boosted by debt-driven infrastructure spending that created economic crises and massive social unrest at the beginning of the 1970s. Facing the end of his constitutionally allowed presidential terms, he declared martial law in 1972 and became dictator under a system of constitutional authoritarianism for fourteen more years. His family and cronies were accused of stealing an estimated US$5 billion to US$10 billion during the 1980s, when the Philippine economy went into a nosedive until Marcos was deposed by the civilian-led People Power Revolution of February 1986.

Various human rights violations were documented in the Ilocos Norte region during the Marcos martial law era, despite public perception that the region was supportive of Marcos' administration. Various farmers from the towns of Vintar, Dumalneg, Solsona, Marcos, and Piddig were documented to have been tortured, and eight farmers in Bangui and three indigenous community members in Vintar were "salvaged" in 1984.

There were also various protests against the Marcos administration at the time, with Aurora Park in the Laoag Plaza being one of the favored places to stage protests. One of the prominent victims of the Martial Law era who came from Laoag was Catholic layperson and social worker Purificacion Pedro, who volunteered in organizations protesting the Chico River Dam Project in the nearby Cordillera Central mountains. Wounded while visiting activist friends in Bataan, she was later killed by Marcos administration soldiers while recuperating in the hospital. Another prominent opponent of the martial law regime was human rights advocate and Bombo Radyo Laoag program host David Bueno, who worked with the Free Legal Assistance Group in Ilocos Norte during the later part of the Marcos administration and the early part of the succeeding Aquino administration. He would later be assassinated by motorcycle-riding men in fatigue uniforms on October 22, 1987 – part of a wave of assassinations that coincided with the 1986-87 coup d'état that tried to unseat the democratic government set up after the 1986 People Power Revolution. Both Bueno and Pedro were later honored among the first 65 people to have their names inscribed on the Wall of Remembrance of the Philippines' Bantayog ng mga Bayani, which honors the martyrs and heroes who fought the dictatorship, and Pedro was listed among Filipino Catholics nominated to be named Servant of God.

Bangui Wind Farm 
In 2005, NorthWind Power Development Corp. began commercial operation of the Bangui Wind Farm in the Municipality of Bangui, having initiated and developed the project in response to a 1996 study by the National Renewable Energy Laboratory (NREL) which identified Bangui as one of the viable sites for wind energy sites in the Philippines. Connected to the Luzon Grid, the project was
the first wind farm in Southeast Asia, supplying 40% of Ilocos Norte's electricity needs, and becoming a major tourist site for Bangui. AC Energy, the listed energy platform of the Ayala Group, acquired the controlling shares of Northwind and of the Bangui Wind Farm in 2017.

Recent history 
Ilocos Norte was among the provinces affected by the COVID-19 pandemic in the Philippines, reporting its first three cases of COVID-19 on March 31, 2020, including a male patient each from Batac and Paoay, and former senator Bongbong Marcos, who had arrived from travel to Spain. Ilocos Norte experienced surges in cases in 2021, with the spike reported in August 2021 being attributed to the Delta variant of the virus.

Geography
Ilocos Norte covers a total area of  occupying the northern tip of the Ilocos Region in Luzon. The province is bordered by Cagayan to the extreme northeast, Apayao to the east, and Abra to the southeast, Ilocos Sur to the southwest, the South China Sea to the west, and the Luzon Strait to the north.

Administrative divisions 

Ilocos Norte comprises 21 municipalities and 2 component cities, further subdivided into 559 barangays. There are two legislative districts in the province. Updated classification of municipalities in Ilocos Norte. Updated Income Class of Ilocos Norte Municipalities

Barangays
Ilocos Norte has 559 barangays comprising its 21 municipalities and 2 cities.

The most populous barangay in the province is Barangay No. 1, San Lorenzo (Poblacion) in the City of Laoag with a population of 4,391 in the 2010 census. If cities are excluded, Davila in the municipality of Pasuquin has the highest population, at 3,900. The least populous is Sapat in the municipality of Pasuquin, with only 32.

Demographics

Religion

Roman Catholicism and the Aglipayan Church are the two major religions in the province.

Among the major Roman Catholic churches in Ilocos Norte include:
 Paoay Church — named a UNESCO World Heritage Site in 1993.
 St. William's Cathedral in Laoag — known for its Sinking Bell Tower
 Santa Monica Church in Sarrat — documented to be the biggest church in the Ilocos Region.
 Bacarra Church — destroyed during an intensity VII (on the Rossi-Forel scale) earthquake on August 17, 1983, reconstructed and re-inaugurated in 1984.

Ilocos Norte is the home of the Aglipay Shrine (Aglipayan Church) where the church's first supreme leader was buried. There are also increasing members of Jehovah's Witnesses. There are also minor but steadily increasing members of Iglesia ni Cristo. Islam is also practiced by Mindanaoan traders and immigrants.

Languages
Aside from the national language and English, there are three indigenous languages in Ilocos Norte. There are the dominant Ilokano language, the Isnag language of the east, and the Faire Atta language in Currimao.

The Faire Atta language is listed as one of the 15 endangered languages of the Philippines according to the UNESCO Atlas of the World's Endangered Languages. The Faire Atta language is listed as Severely Endangered, with less than 300 speakers remaining. All remaining speakers of the language are part of the community's elders. Without a municipality-wide teaching mechanism of the Faire Atta language for the youth, the language may be extinct within 3-5 decades, making it a language in grave peril unless a teaching-mechanism is established by either the government or an educational institution in Currimao and nearby municipalities.

Economy

Products and industries 
The province specializes in the following products and industries:

 Agriculture — rice, corn, garlic, legumes, root crops, tobacco, and other fruits and vegetables
 Fishery — tilapia and assorted fishes
 Livestock — swine and cattle
 Cottage industries — loom weaving, furniture, ceramics, iron works
 Manufacturing and food processing — salt, empanada, bagoong, patis, basi (native Ilocano wine), vinegar, longganisa, chicharon, bagnet, chichacorn (cornick), jewelry, garments, cereal processing, packaging, mechanized processing equipment
 Wind Power — Ilocos Norte's position on the northwest corner of Luzon makes it ideal for wind power generation. There is currently a 25 Megawatt wind farm in Ilocos Norte, and several more wind energy projects are being planned
 Tourism
 Pottery

Culture and the arts

Prominent artists 

Ilocos Norte has given birth to numerous artists that have received national acclaim - perhaps the most notable being Philippine Revolution era activist and leader Juan Luna, who was born in Badoc. The province is also home to at least one National Artists of the Philippines - National Artist for Theater Severino Montano who was conferred the honor in 2001. Another influential artist was Ricarte Puruganan, one of the Philippines' influential "Thirteen Moderns," who broke away from the painting style of Conservatives, led by Fernando Amorsolo, during the first half of the 20th century.

In the folk arts, the Philippines also recognizes Magdalena Gamayo of Pinili.  Ilocos Norte as one of its National Living Treasures for textile weaving, preserving the Inabel weaving tradition of Northern Philippines.

Damili 
The town of San Nicolas, Ilocos Norte is known for its Terra Cotta pottery, called Damili after the Ilocano language word for pottery. San Nicolas' pottery tradition has been declared part of the Philippine National Commission for Culture and the Arts' School of Living Traditions program

Inabel 

Ilocos Norte is a center of the Inabel weaving tradition, whose cloths are well known for being soft but sturdy, with a wide range of pattern designs drawn from Ilocano culture and experience

Cuisine 
Preeminent Philippine culinary historian Doreen Fernandez notes that Bitterness as a flavor principle is a uniquely prominent in Ilocano culture, quoting fellow food critic Edilberto Alegre saying the bitter "Ilocos Norte mystique" is best represented in Papait, a meat variant of Filipino Kilawin characterized by its Bitter flavors.

Government

Term of Office: June 30, 2022 - June 30, 2025

Tourism

Ilocos Norte is a tourist destination, being the location of Fort Ilocandia, hotel, resort and casino.  Built between 1981 and 1983 by the Philippine Tourism Authority, the Spanish-Moroccan Villa was designed by Architect Jeorge Ramos.  The golf course on Paoay Lake was built by Marcos in 1977 and was designed by Gary Player.

Also of note are the La Paz Sand Dunes, Malacañang of the North, Cape Bojeador Lighthouse, Bangui Wind Farm, Saud Beach in Pagudpud and the Early Pliocene calcarenite Kapurpurawan Burgos Formation which was sculpted by wind and waves.

References

External links

 
 
 Ilocos Norte Official Website

 
Provinces of the Philippines
Provinces of the Ilocos Region
States and territories established in 1818
1818 establishments in the Philippines